Queer Gulabi Pride Jaipur is the name of Rajasthan's LGBT Queer pride walk, first held in March 2015 in Jaipur and organised by Nai Bhor Sanstha, a community based organisation working for LGBT rights and development for the last 15 years.

History

2015 
The first Queer Gulabi Pride was held on 1 March 2015 by Nai Bhor Sanstha. The walk commenced from Chomu House circle at 4 pm and ended at Statue Circle, a distance of a kilometre from the starting point. The first pride walk saw close to 100 people walking and participating in the march. This march was a call for action, asking Union and state governments to amend laws, which would allow transgender people to avail welfare schemes such as Mahatma Gandhi National Rural Employment Guarantee Scheme. Following the April 2014 Supreme Court judgement on Transgender Rights, the community marched to voice concerns regarding pending protections.

2016 
The second Queer Gulabi Pride was held on 3 April 2016 and organised by Nai Bhor Sanstha. Around 150-200 people participated in this march. The community marched from Chomu House Circle to Shaheed Smarak.

2017 
The third Queer Gulabi Pride organised by Nai Bhor Sanstha was held on 5 March 2017. The walk started at 3:00 pm and followed the route from Shaheed Smarak to Albert Hall via MI Road, Panch Bhatti, Ajmeri Gate, New Gate and Ram Niwas Bagh.

References 

2015 establishments in Rajasthan
Pride parades in India
Recurring events established in 2015
Culture of Jaipur